Shivalik Enclave is situated between old ManiMajra (also called as Manimajra town) of Sector 13, Chandigarh  and Panchkula. It is Located on The Kalka-Shimla Road Next to Housing Board Light Point. Shivalik Enclave is a part of Chandigarh and one of its boundaries touches the Haryana border at Panchkula. At the time of its conception, it was called Notified Area Committee Manimajra, but the residents changed the name to "Shivalik Enclave". In just 3 decades, this outskirt town transformed into a very luxurious and high-class locality and got the distinction to be one of the best shopping places in and around Chandigarh. IT IS PART OF CHANDIGARH and RECENTLY NAMED SECTOR 13, CHANDIGARH 

Cities and towns in Chandigarh
Cities and towns in Chandigarh district